Demobbed is a 1944 British comedy film directed by John E. Blakeley and starring Norman Evans, Nat Jackley, Gus McNaughton and Dan Young. Billed as "a musical comedy burlesque," its plot concerns a group of ex-soldiers who attempt to gain employment after being demobbed from the army.

Cast

 Norman Evans - Norman
 Nat Jackley - Nat
 Dan Young - Dan
 Betty Jumel - Betty
 Tony Dalton - Billy Brown
 Jimmy Plant - Graham
 George Merritt - James Bentley
 Fred Kitchen - Black
 Arthur Hambling - Curtis
 Gus McNaughton - Capt. Gregson
 Marianne Lincoln - Marianne
 Anne Firth - Norma Deane
 Neville Mapp - John Bentley
 Webster Booth - Himself
 Anne Ziegler - Herself	
 Sydney Bromley - BBC Announcer	
 Kay Lewis - Norman Evan's Partner	
 Freddie Watts - Landlord of the Red Lion	
 Edgar Driver - the Bookie	
 Noel Dainton - Police Inspector	
 Marjorie Gresley - the Mother	
 Angela Glynne - the Child

Critical reception
TV Guide called it an "Occasionally okay slapstick comedy."

References

External links

1944 films
1944 comedy films
Films directed by John E. Blakeley
British comedy films
British black-and-white films
Films scored by Percival Mackey
Films shot in Greater Manchester
1940s English-language films
1940s British films